Impost may mean:
A type of tax, especially a tax levied on imports
A handicap (usually a lead weight) used in horse racing
Impost (architecture): a block or capital on which an arch rests